Ninoslav "Nino" Zec (born 7 July 1949) is a retired Yugoslav professional footballer who played as midfielder or striker.

Career
Born in Miloševo, SR Serbia, Zec began his professional career in 1968 with OFK Beograd. In 1978, Zec moved to the United States to play in the NASL, signing with the Tulsa Roughnecks. He moved to the Atlanta Chiefs in 1979 and was traded to the Houston Hurricane during the season. In 1980, the league terminated the Houston franchise and in December 1980 the Jacksonville Tea Men signed Zec. In 1983, the Tea Men moved to the American Soccer League. Zec spent the 1983 season with the Tea Men in the ASL. When the ASL collapsed at the end of the season, Zec and his teammates moved to the United Soccer League. He also played six games for the Pittsburgh Spirit during the 1979–1980 Major Indoor Soccer League season. He played another three games for the Tulsa Roughnecks during the 1983–1984 NASL indoor season.

He currently lives in Florida where he owns a flooring business. His father in law was one of the most famous Yugoslavian strikers Stjepan Bobek. Zec was the first player ever to receive a yellow card in Yugoslavian football after the booking rule was introduced.

References

External links
 NASL/MISL career stats

1949 births
Living people
American Soccer League (1933–1983) players
Atlanta Chiefs players
Expatriate soccer players in the United States
Yugoslav expatriates in the United States
Yugoslav footballers
Houston Hurricane players
Jacksonville Tea Men players
Major Indoor Soccer League (1978–1992) players
North American Soccer League (1968–1984) indoor players
North American Soccer League (1968–1984) players
OFK Beograd players
Pittsburgh Spirit players
Serbian footballers
Tulsa Roughnecks (1978–1984) players
United Soccer League (1984–85) players
Association football midfielders 
Association football forwards
Yugoslav expatriate footballers